The 2021–22 Loyola Greyhounds men's basketball team represented Loyola University Maryland in the 2021–22 NCAA Division I men's basketball season. The Greyhounds, led by fourth-year head coach Tavaras Hardy, played their home games at Reitz Arena in Baltimore, Maryland as members of the Patriot League.

Previous season
The Greyhounds finished the 2020–21 season 6–11, 4–10 in Patriot League play to finish in last place in the South Division. As the #9 seed in the Patriot League tournament, they were scheduled to face Holy Cross in the first round, but a positive COVID-19 test within the Holy Cross program forced the Crusaders to forfeit the game, moving Loyola into the quarterfinals. In the quarterfinals, the Greyhounds upset top-seeded Navy. Their upset streak continued, upsetting #4 seed Army in the semifinals, advancing to the championship game. Their Cinderella run in the Patriot League Tournament would end in the championship game, where they lost to #2 seeded Colgate.

Roster

Schedule and results

|-
!colspan=12 style=| Exhibition

|-
!colspan=12 style=| Non-conference regular season

|-
!colspan=12 style=| Patriot League regular season

|-
!colspan=9 style=| Patriot League tournament

Sources

References

Loyola Greyhounds men's basketball seasons
Loyola Greyhounds
Loyola Greyhounds men's basketball
Loyola Greyhounds men's basketball